Eeyou Istchee James Bay Regional Government is a local municipality in the  (TE) in administrative region of .

History
On July 24, 2012, the Quebec government signed an accord with the Cree (Agreement on Governance in the Eeyou Istchee James Bay Territory between the Crees of Eeyou Istchee and the Gouvernement du Québec) which resulted in the abolition of the local municipality of Baie-James and the creation of the local municipality of Eeyou Istchee James Bay.  The agreement came into force on January 1, 2014, and is designed to give the Cree expanded powers over lands and resources outside of the Cree municipalities and associated reserved land. The new government consist of Cree and Baie-James  residents each having an equal number of votes.

Overview
The territory comprises all lands of Jamésie (TE) minus the four local municipalities (municipalité locale) — also known as the enclosed municipalities''' — of Chibougamau, Lebel-sur-Quévillon, Chapais, and Matagami, and eight of the nine Cree communities (communautés crie) of Eeyou Istchee TE.

However, the territory includes four unconstituted localities (localités):

Radisson
Valcanton
Val-Paradis
Villebois

Government
Composition & local governance
The territory outside the enclaved Cree communities (Category III lands) is governed by the Eeyou Istchee James Bay Regional Government (le Gouvernement régional d’Eeyou Istchee Baie-James'').  Local governance is carried out by way of the council of regional government, which for its first ten years is to be composed of 11 Cree representatives, 11 Jamésien representatives, and one non-voting representative of the government of Québec.  The Cree representatives consist of the Grand Chief of the Cree Nation Government and then ten members appointed by the Board of the Cree Nation Government from within its own ranks.  The Jamésien representatives consist of members of the local municipal councils of Chapais, Chibougamau, Lebel-sur-Quévillon, and Matagami as well as non-Crees in the Eeyout Istchee James Bay Territory and are appointed by the provincial Minister of Municipal Affairs, Regions and Land Occupancy.  Finally, the non-voting representative of the government of Quebec is appointed by the Deputy Minister of the Ministère des Affaires municipales, des Régions et de l’Occupation du territoire (MAMROT) from amongst its staff.

Regional governance
The enclaved settlements are not under the jurisdiction of the Eeyou Istchee James Bay Regional Government unless an enclaved settlement, by a unanimous vote of its local council, requests partnership with the regional government. In that instance, the territorial regional government may carry out the powers of a regional county municipality (RCM).

Provincial & federal representation
Eeyou Istchee James Bay forms part of the federal electoral district of Abitibi—Baie-James—Nunavik—Eeyou and has been represented by Sylvie Bérubé of the Bloc Québécois since 2019. Provincially, Eeyou Istchee James Bay is part of the Ungava electoral district and is represented by Denis Lamothe of the Coalition Avenir Québec since 2018.

References

External links
 Website of the Eeyou Istchee James Bay Regional Government

Municipalities in Quebec
Territories equivalent to a regional county municipality
Cree reserves and territories

2012 establishments in Quebec
States and territories established in 2012
First Nations geography
Power sharing